Walter Dürst (born June 4, 1950) is a retired Swiss professional ice hockey forward who last played for HC Davos in the National League A. He also represented the Swiss national team at the 1976 Winter Olympics.

References

External links

1950 births
Living people
Swiss ice hockey forwards
Ice hockey players at the 1976 Winter Olympics
Olympic ice hockey players of Switzerland
HC Davos players